Reynaldo Rivera (born 1964) is a photographer known for capturing historic queer, transgender, predominantly Latinx scenes, such as clubs and house parties, in late 20th-century Los Angeles. Some of the clubs he photographed at included La Plaza, the Silverlake Lounge, Mugy’s, and Little Joy. Rivera’s black and white photographs are known for their intimate documentation and focus on the everyday life and private moments of Latinx women, artists, and drag performers at the time. Rivera cites this as a type of activism since gentrification and a lack of public records of these individuals, many of whom die young due to violence, have led to the marginalization and erasure of these communities and cultures. In this way, Rivera is known for bringing visibility to queer, Latinx-Angeleno history.

Early life and career 
Reynaldo Rivera was born in 1964 in Mexicali. Although his birthplace was Mexicali, he proceeded to move between many places in the United States and Mexico growing up. He now resides permanently in East Los Angeles, the site of the queer history he documents through his photos.

Rivera's mother and father, both born in Mexico, met in Stockton. After his parents separated, Rivera oscillated between living with his mother and his father. He navigated his childhood through various places, including Stockton, Pasadena, Mexicali, and Santa Ana, with his sister, Herminia. Although most of Rivera's time was spent with his mother in Glendale, there were times when his father would take Rivera to reside with him. Starting at the age of five, Rivera lived with his grandmother, who was abusive, for four consecutive years after being kidnapped by his father. Thereafter, Rivera's father would often bring him from Glendale to the San Jaoquin Valley, where Rivera was exposed to his father's illegal activities. Rivera also had some run-ins with the law, such as when he was faced with charges in the sixth grade for selling drugs.

Rivera cites photography as a way for him to find stability. His first camera was a Pentax K1000. His photography began by photographing hotel cleaners. Rivera credits the employee at the film development spot he used for explaining the mechanics of his camera to him after his initial pictures were coming out blank. During his early pursuit of photography, he did not have enough money to afford all the film he needed, which he credits with necessitating his development of editing skills. His first piece was a 1983 selection aimed at bringing life to the site in Mexico City where his step-grandfather was murdered.

Rivera’s first professional gig when he entered his 20s was photographing live punk and rock music, such as that performed by Depeche Mode, Siouxsie and the Banshees, and Sonic Youth. From here, he transitioned to photographing drag bars, house parties, and queer clubs, especially in East Los Angeles, including La Plaza during the 1980s and 1990s.

Works, exhibitions, projects, collections

Notable works / selected works 
Tatiana Volty, 1986, Silverlake Lounge
 Anna LaCazio and Judy Pokonosky, 1989, Echo Park
 Elyse Regehr and Javier Orosco, 1989, Downtown LA
 Miss Alex, 1992, Echo Park
 Olga, 1992, La Plaza
 Wes Cuttler, 1992, Echo Park
 Angela, 1993, La Plaza    
 Gaby, Reynaldo and Angela, 1993, La Plaza
 Laura, La Plaza, 1993
 Melissa and Gaby, 1993, La Plaza
 Montenegro, 1995, Silverlake Lounge
 Patron, 1995, Silverlake Lounge
 Performer, 1995, Silverlake Lounge
 Tina, 1995, Mugy’s
 Vanessa, 1995, Silverlake Lounge
 Richard Villegas Jr., friend, and Enrique, 1996
 Girls, 1997, El Conquistador
 La Plaza, 1997, La Plaza

Exhibitions, projects and collections 
 Kiss Me Deadly, Reena Spaulings Fine Art, 2021, New York
 Made in LA 2020: A Version, Hammer Museum / The Huntington Library, 2021, Los Angeles
 Comedy of Errors, The Gallery At, 2020, Hollywood
 Avengers - Someone Left a Cake Out in the Rain, Gaga & Reena Spaulings Fine Art, 2019, Los Angeles

References 

1964 births

Living people
Photographers from Los Angeles
20th-century American photographers
1980s in LGBT history
1990s in LGBT history